Emanuela Zardo  (born 24 April 1970) is a former professional tennis player who competed for Switzerland. She was active on the WTA Tour in the late 1980s and through the 1990s, and was among the top 100 in the world between 1990 and 1994.

Zardo reached her highest ranking of No. 27 on 6 May 1991. She won one WTA singles title, and was also twice a runner-up in singles competition.

Her best performance at a Grand Slam occurred at the 1994 Australian Open, when she made the fourth round before losing to Jana Novotná.

WTA career finals

Singles: 3 (1–2)

ITF finals

Singles (10-5)

Doubles (0-2)

Grand Slam singles performance timeline

References

External links
 
 

1970 births
Living people
Swiss female tennis players
Olympic tennis players of Switzerland
Tennis players at the 1992 Summer Olympics